Mats Wilander was the defending champion.

Wilander successfully defended his title, defeating John McEnroe 6–3, 6–4 in the final.

Seeds

  Boris Becker (quarterfinals)
  Mats Wilander (champion)
  John McEnroe (final)
  Emilio Sánchez (first round)
  Jonas Svensson (semifinals)
  Jakob Hlasek (quarterfinals)
  Anders Järryd (semifinals)
  Amos Mansdorf (second round)

Draw

Finals

Top half

Bottom half

References

 Main Draw

1987 Grand Prix (tennis)
Donnay Indoor Championships